Shivajinagar is one of the seats in Karnataka Legislative Assembly in India. It is a segment of Bangalore Central Lok Sabha constituency.

Members of Legislative Assembly
 1967: H. R. A. Gaffar, Indian National Congress 
 1972: S. Hamed Sha, Indian National Congress (Organisation)
 1978: C. M. Ibrahim, Janata Party
 1983: M. Raghupathy, Janata Party
 1985: R. Roshan Baig, Janata Party
 1989: A. K. Anatha Krishna, Indian National Congress 
 1994: R. Roshan Baig, Janata Dal
 1999: Katta Subramanya Naidu, Bharatiya Janata Party
 2004: Katta Subramanya Naidu, Bharatiya Janata Party
 2008: R. Roshan Baig, Indian National Congress 
 2013: R. Roshan Baig, Indian National Congress
 2018: R. Roshan Baig, Indian National Congress
 2019 (by-poll): Arshad Rizwan, Indian National Congress

Election results

1983 Vidhan Sabha
 M. Raghupathy (Janatha Party) : 21,319
 C. M. Ibrahim	(Congress) : 13,792

2018 Vidhan Sabha
 Roshan Baig (Congress) : 59,742
 Katta Subramanya Naidu (BJP) : 44,702

2019 by-poll
 Arshad Rizwan (Congress) : 49,000 (won by  13000 votes)
 A Saravana  (BJP) : approx 38,000 votes

See also
 Shivajinagar
 Bangalore Urban district
 List of constituencies of Karnataka Legislative Assembly

References

Assembly constituencies of Karnataka
Bangalore Urban district